Bruno Amorim Lazaroni (born 13 September 1980) is a Brazilian retired football manager and former player who played as a defensive midfielder. He is the current assistant manager of Coritiba.

Playing career
Lazaroni was born in Rio de Janeiro, and represented Flamengo as a youth. A forward, he left the club in 2000 after making no appearances, and subsequently joined Bangu, where he was converted into a defensive midfielder.

In 2002, after impressing for Bangu, Lazaroni joined Vasco da Gama, but featured sparingly for the club. In 2004, after a one-year spell at Swiss club FC St. Gallen (where he also appeared rarely), he returned to Bangu.

Lazaroni subsequently spent the remainder of his career in the lower leagues, representing Atlético Sorocaba, União Barbarense, America-RJ (two spells) and Portuguesa, aside from five seasons abroad, three with Naval in Portugal and two with Al-Ittifaq in Saudi Arabia. He retired with the latter in 2012, aged 32.

Coaching career
After retiring, Lazaroni returned to his hometown and was named in charge of Botafogo's youth setup in 2014, initially assigned to the under-13 squad. He then left the club in the following year to join his father at Qatar SC, but returned to Bota to take over the technical coordinator of the club's youth sides.

In February 2017, Lazaroni was named general manager of Botafogo's youth setup, but was appointed permanent assistant manager in January 2018. He was subsequently an interim manager of the main squad on two occasions, after the dismissals of Marcos Paquetá and Eduardo Barroca, respectively.

On 1 October 2020, Lazaroni was appointed manager of Botafogo's main squad after the resignation of Paulo Autuori. However, after only 28 days, he was relieved from his duties.

On 13 March 2021, Lazaroni moved to Athletico Paranaense to become their under-23 manager in the 2021 Campeonato Paranaense.

Personal life
Lazaroni is the son of Sebastião Lazaroni, who is also a manager.

Honours
Vasco da Gama
Campeonato Carioca: 2003

References

External links
Bruno Lazaroni at Soccerway

1980 births
Living people
Footballers from Rio de Janeiro (city)
Brazilian footballers
Association football midfielders
Campeonato Brasileiro Série B players
CR Flamengo footballers
Bangu Atlético Clube players
CR Vasco da Gama players
Clube Atlético Sorocaba players
União Agrícola Barbarense Futebol Clube players
America Football Club (RJ) players
Associação Portuguesa de Desportos players
Swiss Super League players
FC St. Gallen players
Primeira Liga players
Associação Naval 1º de Maio players
Saudi Professional League players
Ettifaq FC players
Brazilian expatriate footballers
Expatriate footballers in Switzerland
Expatriate footballers in Portugal
Expatriate footballers in Saudi Arabia
Brazilian football managers
Campeonato Brasileiro Série A managers
Botafogo de Futebol e Regatas managers